Heloísa Helena Lima de Moraes Carvalho (born 6 June 1962 in Pão de Açúcar, Alagoas) is a Brazilian nurse, schoolteacher, and politician, member of the political party Rede Sustentabilidade. She is the Brazilian woman to have received the third highest voting in a presidential race, ranking behind Marina Silva and Dilma Rousseff in 2010.

In 1998, she was elected Senator for Alagoas, having attained the highest vote count in that election. Then a member of the Workers' Party, she disagreed with certain policies that she deemed excessively conservative. Thus, in 2003 she voted against the overhaul of public servants' pensions carried out in the first term of President Luiz Inácio Lula da Silva, and, as a result, was expelled from the party. The following year, she was one of the founding members of the Socialism and Liberty Party. In 2013, she helped found the Rede Sustentabilidade Party, and has been a member thereof since then.

Career
A trained nurse, Helena helped found the Center of Health at the Federal University of Alagoas. She was also involved in the student movements against the military dictatorship. She became a member of the left-wing Workers' Party (PT) and a leader of Socialist Democracy, a Trotskyist caucus in PT.

In 1992, Helena was chosen as deputy mayor of Maceió as part of the PT-PSB coalition government. In 1994, she was elected as a councilwoman in Alagoas and in 1998 was elected to the Federal Senate. After PT's Luiz Inácio Lula da Silva won the presidency in 2002, Heloísa became one of the strongest critics of the new government's alignment with centrist politics. After voting against the party recommendation in the Senate, she was expelled from PT in December 2003 for allegedly breaking party discipline. She kept her seat in the Senate as an Independent politician.

Following her expulsion, Helena and other dissident members of PT founded a new party, the Socialism and Freedom Party (PSOL) in late 2004. She was the president of PSOL from 2004 to 2010, in addition to leading the Freedom and Revolution faction of the party. Helena was PSOL's candidate for president in the 2006 general elections. She had 6% of the voting, obtaining almost 6.6 million votes. During the following election, she was elected a councilwoman for Maceió, becoming the top voted candidate in the Alagoas state after achieving almost 30,000 votes.

On 20 October 2010, it was announced by the media that Heloísa had left the presidency of PSOL. The councilwoman and former senator said she decided to departure from the national presidency of the party because of its support to Workers' Party presidential candidate Dilma Rousseff during the second round of the 2010 election. (In reality, PSOL only declared "critical support" of Rousseff, stating that it only chose to do so in order to secure the defeat of "right-wing" candidate José Serra in the general elections, and that it would continue to oppose the centrist PT government; many members of the party, including defeated presidential candidate Plínio de Arruda Sampaio, chose to annul their vote, refusing to support Rousseff.) In the press release, Helena made it clear that she will continue on PSOL.

At the same election, Helena unsuccessfully ran for a seat in the Senate for Alagoas. Despite leading the polls for a considerable amount of time, she got 417,636 votes (16.6% of the total), finishing the race in third, behind Benedito de Lira and Renan Calheiros.

In March 2022 she was amongst 151 international feminists signing Feminist Resistance Against War: A Manifesto, in solidarity with the Feminist Anti-War Resistance initiated by Russian feminists after the Russian invasion of Ukraine.

References

External links 
  Official web site
  "Victory for PT in municipal elections" by Heloísa Helena (February 2001)
  Interview with Heloísa Helena
  Interview with Heloísa Helena

1962 births
Brazilian socialists
Brazilian women in politics
Candidates for President of Brazil
Living people
People from Alagoas
Workers' Party (Brazil) politicians
Socialism and Liberty Party politicians
Sustainability Network politicians
Members of the Chamber of Deputies (Brazil) from Alagoas
Members of the Legislative Assembly of Alagoas